Deuce 7 (also known as Deuce Seven, Twenty Seven, 27) is the pseudonym of an American artist based in Dunsmuir, California.

Background
Deuce 7 has been a railfan (trainspotter) since his early days, and eventually began freighthopping as a means of transport as well as to spread his work beyond the Minneapolis area. His love of trains and freighthopping strongly influences his art. Locomotives, freight cars, and railyard denizens are recurrent motifs in his work. He calls the west coast home, but his monikers can be seen on train cars throughout the United States.

He got his pseudonym from the markings on an old diesel locomotive, BNSF 6127, signing his work with a "27". Eventually it was suggested that he spell the name out "Deuce 7". He currently lives in Mt Shasta, California.

Work
Deuce 7 started working as a street artist in the 1990s in Minneapolis. 
Since 2006 has been exhibiting work in a gallery in Minneapolis and later in New York City, Seattle, and other major cities.

Style
Deuce 7 uses aerosol paint, one-shot, and oilbars to create intensely colorful, spidery images of a variety of subjects which he refers to as "stories", which include characters he has met on his travels, romantic interests, trains, cityscapes, as well as purely expressive, surrealist images.

His fine art pieces carry the design hallmarks of his street style, and are also typically rendered with one-shot, ink, watercolor, and/or enamel spray paint.  Some pieces utilize mixed media including masks, found objects, and baroque moldings. His pen and ink drawings frequently evoke stark, decaying cityscapes of crumbling tenement buildings patrolled by strange vehicles and airborne creatures.

References

External links

Media
The Deuce is Loose! Street artist Deuce 7 brings his chaotic masterpieces to the Soo, Tony Libera, mndaily.com, April 2009
Street artist Deuce Seven returns to his stomping grounds, Susannah Schouweiler, MinnPost.com  March 2009
Deuce 7, Seattle Weekly, 2008
Our Old Pal Deuce Seven Bombs a Club Toilet, Camille Dodero, Village Voice, November 2008
 The Alien Invader, Camille Dodero, Village Voice, 2007, March 2007
New King in Town: Deuce 7, Jake Dobkin, The Gothamist, Feb. 2007

Year of birth missing (living people)
Living people
American graffiti artists
Artists from Minneapolis
Pseudonymous artists
Public art